The 1995 Australian Touring Car Championship was a CAMS sanctioned Australian motor racing title for 5.0 Litre Touring Cars complying with Group 3A regulations. The championship, which was the 36th Australian Touring Car Championship, was contested over a ten rounds between February and August 1995. The series was won by John Bowe driving a Dick Johnson Racing Ford EF Falcon.

Television Coverage

Channel 7's 1995 coverage was led by Mike Raymond for the final time before his retirement from full-time broadcasting and he was once again joined by Allan Moffat and Mark Oastler in the broadcast booth with Andy Raymond in pit-lane.

The broadcast was again on same-day delay due to the network's coverage of the AFL across the nation.

Pre-season
The Ford EF Falcon and Holden VR Commodore were both homologated for competition. The changes were largely cosmetic, allowing teams to reskin their existing EB Falcons and VP Commodores. With no material gain in performance expected, many of the privateer teams elected to retain their cars in EB and VP trim.

In January 1995 Dunlop, who supplied tyres to Dick Johnson Racing, Perkins Engineering and Wayne Gardner Racing as well as all of the privateer teams, had their factory in Kobe destroyed in the Great Hanshin earthquake. While production was shifted to England, teams had to ration their tyre stocks. To help the situation, Bridgestone later relaxed its policy of only supplying contracted teams, providing tyres to James Rosenberg Racing and Romano Racing at the final round.

Defending champion Mark Skaife missed the opening round of the championship after sustaining injuries in a testing accident ahead of the Winfield Triple Challenge at Eastern Creek that destroyed a Gibson Motorsport VR Commodore.

Teams and drivers
Movements
Greg Crick, having severed his relationship with Pinnacle Motorsport, purchased Larry Perkins' 1994 VP Commodore, he would only contest the first two rounds, later selling the car to M3 Motorsport
Daily Planet Racing switched manufacturers, selling its VP Commodore and purchasing a Dick Johnson Racing EB Falcon

Arrivals / returnees
Alcair Racing entered the series with David Attard driving Paul Morris' 1994 VP Commodore, contesting all rounds
James Rosenberg Racing entered the series with Mark Poole driving the 1993 Bathurst 1000 winning VP Commodore purchased from Daily Planet Racing
Larkham Motor Sport entered the series with Mark Larkham debuting an EF Falcon at round 3
Longhurst Racing entered the series after the shareholders in LoGaMo Racing decided to go in separate directions. Frank Gardner and Terry Morris wanted to compete in the Australian Super Touring Championship as the factory BMW team while Tony Longhurst wanted to remain in the V8 series. As a result, Gardner and Morris bought out Longhurst's share in Logamo, with Longhurst forming a new team to race an EF Falcon.
Phil Ward Racing competed in a few rounds with an ex Advantage Racing VP Commodore, Phil Ward returning to the championship having last competed in 1990
Pinnacle Motorsport signed Allan Grice for what was supposed to be his first full season since 1987, however after the team missed a couple of rounds, the arrangement had been terminated by the last round where Grice drove a third Glenn Seton Racing entry
Romano Racing entered the series with Paul Romano driving Tony Longhurst's 1994 VP Commodore, contesting all rounds

Departures
LoGaMo Racing withdrew from the series to concentrate on the Australian Super Touring Championship, thus Paul Morris did not compete
1994 Privateer's Champion Bob Jones did not defend his crown after major sponsor Ampol withdrew

The following drivers and teams competed in the 1995 Australian Touring Car Championship:

Race calendar
The championship was contested over a ten-round series. Each round featured a "Peter Jackson Dash", a short sprint race which was restricted to the top ten cars from qualifying, and two main races which were open to all competitors. Unlike previous seasons, the dash did not set the grid order for the main races. The Amaroo Park round was replaced by a round at Mount Panorama which held an ATCC round for the first time since 1972.

Points system
 Championship points were awarded on a 3-2-1 basis for the first three places in the Peter Jackson Dash at each round.
 One bonus championship point was awarded for each position gained & held by a driver during the Peter Jackson Dash at each round.
 Championship points were awarded on a 20-16-14-12-10-8-6-4-2-1 basis for the first ten places in each of the two main races at each round.

Results
Rounds were won by John Bowe (4), Glenn Seton (4), Larry Perkins (1) and Mark Skaife (1). Going into the final round Bowe, Seton and Peter Brock were in contention with Bowe prevailing.

Championship standings

Note: Race 1 at the Phillip Island round was stopped before full race distance due to multiple accidents brought about by heavy rain, and only half points were awarded.

Privateers Cup
The Motorsport News / Dunlop Privateers Cup was won by David Attard.

See also
1995 Australian Touring Car season

References

External links
 Official V8 Supercar site

Australian Touring Car Championship seasons
Touring Cars